Gordon Robertson Cameron (November 12, 1921 – August 10, 2010) was a businessman and former political figure in the Yukon, Canada. He served as the commissioner of Yukon from 1962 to 1966.

He was born in Pictou, Nova Scotia and educated in Vancouver. He was an apprentice at the British Yukon Navigation Company and was manager of Klondike Helicopters Limited. Cameron lived in Whitehorse. He was mayor of Whitehorse from 1958 to 1960.

References 

Commissioners of Yukon
Mayors of Whitehorse
1921 births
2010 deaths
People from Pictou County